Bisgaard is a Danish surname. Notable people with the surname include:

Erik Bisgaard (1890–1987), Danish rower 
Morten Bisgaard (born 1974), Danish footballer
Per Bisgaard (born 1955), Danish politician

Danish-language surnames